Paolo Posi (1708 - 1776) was an Italian architect of the late-Baroque period. Among the cities in which he was active were Rome, Narni, and Viterbo. Among the other works, he designed mausoleums for Cardinal Inico Caracciolo in Aversa, Cardinal Giuseppe Renato Imperiali in the church of Sant'Agostino in Rome, for cardinal Carafa in Sant'Andrea delle Fratte (1759), and for princess Maria Flaminia Chigi-Odescalchi (1771) in the church of Santa Maria del Popolo.

Works
Posi was born in Siena. In 1734-1742 he helped in the restoration of the Cathedral of Naples. From 1751 onwards he was the family architect of the Colonna family. Posi helped with the ephemeral obsequies held in Santi Apostoli (a church near their residence) in Rome, after the death of James Stuart, the pretender to the crown of England, as well as supervising firework displays for the Colonna. In 1767, Lorenzo Colonna commissioned Posi to design the ephemeral celebratory machine de artifizio with fireworks on the occasion of the provision of a Chinea, or richly caparisoned mule (symbol and veritable tribute) to Pope Clement XIII.

Posi decorated the main altar of the church of Santa Maria dell'Anima in Rome as if it had been a pagan Bacchus temple, and was dismissed by the church deputies.

Nominated as architect to St Peter's Basilica and Knight of the Golden Spur, Posi helped design the Jesuit church in Sinigaglia, and the place of Abbot Farsetti in Santa Maria di Sala, in the Veneto. He helped rebuild the Palazzo Colonna and rebuilt the church of Santa Caterina dei Senesi. Poli also designed the façade of the abbey church in the Certosa of Trisulti (1798).

He was a teacher of Italian architect Giacomo Quarenghi.

References

1708 births
1776 deaths
18th-century Italian architects
Italian Baroque architects